The 2016 Metropolitan FA season was the club's second season of existence. The club played in the Puerto Rico Soccer League, the first tier of the Puerto Rico soccer pyramid.

Transfers

In

Out

Loans in

Loans out

Trial

Competitions

Pre-season 

The 2016 Metropolitan FA schedule has not been announced.

Puerto Rico Soccer League

PRSL Apertura season

Matches

PRSL Clausura season

Standings

Matches

PRSL Playoffs

Copa Luis Villarejo 

The 2017 Copa Luis Villarejo schedule has not been announced.

Goal scorers

References

Puerto Rico Soccer League
2016 in Puerto Rican football